Júlia Sigmond (11 July 1929 – 23 March 2020) was a Hungarian-Romanian puppet actor, Esperanto writer and editor. She was born in Turda and died in Piacenza of coronavirus disease 2019.

Career 
Júlia Sigmond was a puppet actor of the Hungarian language section of the puppet theater of Cluj, Romania. She became an Esperantist in 1956. She was the editor-in-chief of the magazine Bazaro and a regular contributor to the magazine Monato.

Works 
 2001 – Mi ne estas Mona Lisa, (pub. Bero, Berkeley)
 2008 – Kiam mi estis la plej feliĉa en la vivo? (compiled by the author), (pub. Triade, Cluj-Napoca)
 2009 – Novaj fabeloj pri Ursido Pu kaj Porketo (kd)
 2011 – Nomoj kaj sortoj (12 novels), (pub. Exit, Cluj-Napoca)
 2013 – Dialogo (original poem with 52 translations), (pub. Exit, Cluj-Napoca)
 2013 – Libazar' kaj Tero (joint work with Sen Rodin, her husband), (pub. Mondial, New York)
 2015 – Kvodlibeto (joint work with Sen Rodin, her husband), (pub. Exit, Cluj-Napoca)
 2016 – Kvin geamikoj, (pub. Exit, Cluj-Napoca)
 2017 – Fronto aŭ dorsko, (pub. Dokumenta Esperanto-Centro, Đurđevac)
 2017 – Doloro (original poem with 54 translations), (pub. Exit, Cluj-Napoca)
 2018 – Steĉjo-Fabeloj, (pub. Exit, Cluj-Napoca)
 2018 – Dankon (original poem with 62 translations), (pub. Exit, Cluj-Napoca)
 2019 – 90, various texts on the occasion of the author's 90th birthday (pub. Exit, Cluj-Napoca)

References 

1929 births
2020 deaths
Romanian actresses
Romanian Esperantists
20th-century Romanian writers
20th-century Romanian women writers
Hungarian actresses
Hungarian Esperantists
20th-century Hungarian writers
20th-century Hungarian women writers
Writers of Esperanto literature
Deaths from the COVID-19 pandemic in Emilia-Romagna
People from Turda